England national under-20 football team, also known as England Under-20s or England U20(s), represents England in association football at an under-20 age level and is controlled by the Football Association, the governing body for football in England.

England were champions of the FIFA U-20 World Cup, after defeating Venezuela in the final of the 2017 tournament. Since the 2017–18 season, England contest the Under 20 Elite League.

The team are currently managed by Ian Foster.

Tournament history

FIFA U-20 World Cup

Fixtures and results

2017–18 Under 20 Elite League

2018–19 Under 20 Elite League

2019–20 Under 20 Elite League

2021–22 Under 20 Elite League

Players

Current squad
Players born between September 2002 and August 2003 are second-year graduates of the English academy system, players born between September 2003 and August 2004 are first-year graduates. Players born after 1 January 2004 remain eligible to play for England under-19s.

The following players were named in the squad for games against Germany, USA and France, to be played between 22 and 28 March 2023.

Names in italics denote players who have been capped by England in a higher age group.

Recent call-ups
The following players have previously been called up to the England under-20 squad in the last 12 months and remain eligible.

  Player withdrew from the squad before any games had been played.

References

External links
Official FA England Under-20 website
FIFA U-20 World Cup website

20
European national under-20 association football teams